The Institute of Conjuncture was founded in Moscow in October 1920 by Nikolai Kondratiev as a center for the study of business cycles. As its first director, Kondratiev managed to develop the institute, from just a couple of scientists at its beginning, into a large and respected institution with 51 researchers in 1923.

History 
The Institute was organized in September 1920 at the Timiryazev (Petrovsky) Agricultural Academy. By the decision of the professorial council, N. D. Kondratiev was appointed head of the institute. The staff of the institute was 5 people: the head, his deputy and three statisticians. Senior students and graduate students of the Agricultural Academy  were involved in the activity .

The main goal of the institute was the theoretical study of the conjuncture and the systematic observation of its changes in the world and, in particular, in the USSR.

In 1922, the first significant work of the Institute was published: N. Kondratiev's “The World Economy and its Conjuncture During and After the War”, which outlined his theory of business cycles.

Since the middle of 1922, the institute has regularly published calculations of retail price indices, studies of the dynamics of the agricultural market, money circulation and credit. These works, combined with the advent of the NEP, which significantly increased the practical importance of research on the problems of the conjuncture, determined the need to transfer the institute to the structure of the People's Commissariat for Finance of the USSR.

With the collapse of the NEP and the transition to administrative-command methods of managing the economy, the activities of the Market Institute were recognized as "bourgeois" and "harmful". The sharp criticism of the first five-year plan in the publications of the Institute of the Project  also played its role.

From the middle of 1927, the head of the Market Research Institute was subjected to harsh political accusations. In April 1928, N. Kondratiev was removed from the post of head of the institute, and a little later, he was fired from Narkomfin. On May 8, by decision of the Council of People's Commissars of the USSR, the institute was ordered to be transferred from the People's Commissariat of Finance to the Central Statistical Directorate. The reasons provided for the decision were the need to streamline statistical research in the country and their centralization to avoid duplication. Attempts to challenge the decision had no effect.

After the transfer of July 14, 1928, 42 people went to work in the CSD. P. I. Popov became the director of the Institute. The most important research activities of the institute stopped, since they were impossible outside the Narkomfin. The Institute was liquidated in January 1930 after the transformation of the Central Statistical Administration into the management of the Gosplan.

Education in Moscow